Bidoungui Airport  is an airport serving the village of Bakoumba in the Haut-Ogooué Province of Gabon.

See also

 List of airports in Gabon
 Transport in Gabon

References

External links
OpenStreetMap - Bidoungui
HERE/Nokia - Bidoungui

Airports in Gabon